Kharbozan may refer to:
 Kharbozan-e Bala
 Kharbozan-e Pain